Ernest "Ernie" Whittle (25 November 1925 – 1998) was an English footballer.

He played for South Moor Juniors, Newcastle United, Seaham Colliery, Lincoln City, Workington, Chesterfield, Bradford Park Avenue and Scarborough.

Notes

1925 births
1998 deaths
English footballers
Association football forwards
Newcastle United F.C. players
Seaham Colliery Welfare F.C. players
Lincoln City F.C. players
Workington A.F.C. players
Chesterfield F.C. players
Bradford (Park Avenue) A.F.C. players
Scarborough F.C. players
English Football League players
People from Lanchester, County Durham
Footballers from County Durham